Golden Dawn (Chrysi Avgi in Greek) was a neo-fascist magazine published between 1980 and 1984 in Greece. The magazine was media outlet of the political group with the same name.

History and profile
Golden Dawn was launched by an extremist group led by Nikolaos Michaloliakos who also edited it. Then, they started a political group with the same name of which the goal was to disseminate their views through the magazine. The group adhered to the social nationalism and fascism, and the magazine described itself as a platform of social nationalism. It frequently published articles about Adolf Hitler praising Nazism. Its cover featured the swastika as its symbol.

The magazine was temporarily closed down by the Greek government in 1983. Golden Dawn resumed publication in 1984, but it was banned and permanently folded the same year.

References

External links

1980 establishments in Greece
1984 disestablishments in Greece
Defunct magazines published in Greece
Defunct political magazines
Fascist newspapers and magazines
Magazines established in 1980
Magazines disestablished in 1984
Greek-language magazines
Fascism in Greece
Banned magazines